= Harveys Island =

Island in Georgia, United States

Coordinates: 31.87128°N 81.10006°W

Harveys Island is an island in the U.S. state of Georgia.

Harveys Island most likely bears the name of an early settler.
